Tillergone Slope is a glacial slope, 1.2 nautical miles (2.2 km) wide, which is a distributary of Flight Deck Neve between Dotson Ridge and Flagship Mountain, in Convoy Range, Victoria Land. The name was applied by a New Zealand Antarctic Research Program (NZARP) field party to commemorate an incident when the steering gear of a motor toboggan broke during the 1989–90 season. At the time, this glacier was being used as access to a camp at Flagship Mountain, and the slope had to be negotiated twice without steerage.

Ice slopes of Antarctica
Landforms of Victoria Land
Scott Coast